The 2004 Mountain West Conference football season was the sixth since eight former members of the Western Athletic Conference banded together to form the Mountain West Conference. It was the last season of the conference's original eight-team line up, as Texas Christian University (TCU) had agreed to join the conference for the 2005 season.  The Utah won the conference championship in 2004, the Utes' third title since the league began in 1999.  On the strength of their perfect 11–0 record in the regular season, Utah became the first team from a BCS non-AQ conference to be invited to a Bowl Championship Series (BCS) bowl when they accepted an invitation to play Pittsburgh in the Fiesta Bowl.

Bowl games

Awards
Coach of the Year: Urban Meyer, Utah
Offensive Player of the Year: QB Alex Smith, Jr, Utah
Co-Defensive Players of the Year: LB Kirk Morrison, Sr, San Diego State and DB Morgan Scalley, Sr, Utah
Freshman of the Year: WR Austin Collie, BYU

Pre-Season All Conference Team

All Conference Team